Ballyda is a small townland in the civil parish of Danesfort in County Kilkenny, Ireland.

See also
 List of townlands in County Kilkenny

References

Townlands of County Kilkenny